The International Society for Research in Child and Adolescent Psychopathology (abbreviated ISRCAP) is an international learned society dedicated to advancing research on psychopathology. It was established in 1988 by Herbert C. Quay, and its first meeting was held in Zandvoort, Netherlands, in 1989. It has held biennial meetings in different locations ever since. It is registered in the United States state of Illinois as a 501(c)(3) non-profit organization. Its official peer-reviewed journal is the Journal of Abnormal Child Psychology, which is published by Springer Science+Business Media.

Presidents
The president of the ISRCAP is Linda Pfiffner, whose term lasts from 2017 to 2019. Past presidents of the organization include Joel Nigg, Russell Barkley, Benjamin Lahey, Michael Rutter, and Stephen P. Hinshaw.

References

External links

Child and adolescent psychiatry organizations
Non-profit organizations based in Illinois
501(c)(3) organizations
Psychology organizations based in the United States
International learned societies
Scientific organizations established in 1988
Psychopathology